Prunum smalli is a species of sea snail, a marine gastropod mollusk in the family Marginellidae, the margin snails. Commonly found in Cuba, Caribbean islands and Costa Rica.

References

Marginellidae
Gastropods described in 2002